Brian Canvin Peets (born July 15, 1956) is a former American football tight end who played three seasons in the National Football League with the Seattle Seahawks and San Francisco 49ers. He played college football at the University of the Pacific and attended Linden High School in Linden, California. He was a member of the San Francisco 49ers team that won Super Bowl XVI.

References

External links
Just Sports Stats
College Stats
Fanbase profile

Living people
1956 births
Players of American football from Stockton, California
American football tight ends
Pacific Tigers football players
Seattle Seahawks players
San Francisco 49ers players
People from Linden, California